Since the 2007 municipal reform, only the Social Democrats had held the mayor's position in Middelfart Municipality. 

In 2017, Steen Dahlstrøm from the Social Democrats, who had been mayor for over 30 years, announced his immediate resignation, and Johannes Lundsfryd Jensen would take over. He would win 14 seats in the 2017 Middelfart municipal election, one more than required for an absolute majority.

For this election however, the Social Democrats would lose 3 seats. Venstre would win 7 seats, the most ever in the four elections after the municipal reform. However parties of the traditional red bloc won 14 seats, and Johannes Lundsfryd Jensen was in pole position to win a second term. It was later confirmed that he would continue as mayor.

Electoral system
For elections to Danish municipalities, a number varying from 9 to 31 are chosen to be elected to the municipal council. The seats are then allocated using the D'Hondt method and a closed list proportional representation.
Middelfart Municipality had 25 seats in 2021

Unlike in Danish General Elections, in elections to municipal councils, electoral alliances are allowed.

Electoral alliances  

Electoral Alliance 1

Electoral Alliance 2

Electoral Alliance 3

Electoral Alliance 4

Results

Notes

References 

Middelfart